Erté is a crater on Mercury.  Its name was adopted by the International Astronomical Union (IAU) in 2013. It is named for the artist and designer known as Erté.

Erté is one of the largest craters of the Kuiperian system on Mercury. The largest is Bartók crater.

References

Impact craters on Mercury